Trinidad Olga Ramos Sanguino (18 July 1918 – 25 August 2005) was a Spanish cupletista, violinist, and actress known as the queen of the cuplé.

Life and career

She studied violin at the Madrid Royal Conservatory, where she won the first prize for chamber music in 1943.

After a few years withdrawn from the world of entertainment, from 1967 to 1978 she sang at the Madrid venue El Último Cuplé, at 51 , until its closure. Two years later, Ramos reopened the club, becoming an entrepreneur, with her daughter, under the name Las Noches del Cuplé, and performed there daily until its final closure in 1999.

Her husband, Enrique Martínez de Gamboa, composed several of her songs.

Discography
 Madrid entre cuplés y canciones
 Puro cuplé

Awards and distinctions
 First prize for chamber music from the Madrid Royal Conservatory
 Madrid Medal for artistic merit
 Lady of the Order of Isabella the Catholic
 Gold medal for merit at work
 Gold medal of Agustín Lara
 Plaque at the Memory Plan of Madrid (Puerta del Sol)
 Garbanzo de Plata
 "Voz microfónica" of the Estudios Roptence in Madrid
 Medal of the Villa y Corte Foundation
 Community gold medal of the Canary Islands
 Cibeles Honor Award of the Madrid Forum

References

External links
 

1918 births
2005 deaths
20th-century Spanish actresses
20th-century Spanish singers
Burials at Cementerio de la Almudena
Cupletistas
Singers from Extremadura
People from Badajoz
Recipients of the Order of Isabella the Catholic
Spanish musical theatre actresses
Spanish violinists
20th-century Spanish women singers
20th-century violinists